Addo Elephant National Park is a diverse wildlife conservation park situated close to Gqeberha in South Africa and is one of the country's 20 national parks. It currently ranks third in size after Kruger National Park and the Kgalagadi Transfrontier Park.

History 
The original section of the park was founded in 1931, in part due to the efforts of Sydney Skaife, in order to provide a sanctuary for the eleven remaining elephants in the area. The park has proved to be very successful and currently houses more than 600 elephants and a large number of other mammals.

Expansion 
The original park has subsequently been expanded to include the Woody Cape Nature Reserve that extends from the Sundays River mouth towards Alexandria and a marine reserve, which includes St. Croix Island and Bird Island, both breeding habitat for gannets and penguins, not to mention a large variety of other marine life. Bird Island is home to the world's largest breeding colony of gannets - about 120,000 birds - and also hosts the second largest breeding colony of African penguins, the largest breeding colony being St. Croix island. These marine assets form part of the plan to expand the 1,640 km² Addo National Elephant Park into the 3,600 km² Greater Addo Elephant National Park.

The expansion will mean not only that the park contains five of South Africa's seven major vegetation zones (biomes), but also that it will be the only park in the world to house Africa's "Big 7“ (elephant, rhinoceros, lion, buffalo, leopard, whale and great white shark) in their natural habitat.

Flora and fauna 

The flora within the AENP is quite varied, and like all plant life, is a central factor to the ecological system in place. Several species of rare and endemic plants, particularly succulent shrubs and geophytes are native to the South African region within the AENP. Many species are under environmental pressure, however, and are facing possible extinction.

The park is home to more than 600 elephants, 400 Cape buffaloes, over 48 endangered black rhinos (Diceros bicornis michaeli) as well as a variety of antelope species. Lion and spotted hyena have also recently been re-introduced to the area. The largest remaining population of the flightless dung beetle (Circellium bacchus) is located within the park.

Extinction and overpopulation
Two major environmental issues facing the AENP: extinction and overpopulation, which are interrelated. Since the AENP's original mission was to reintroduce certain mega-herbivores, like the African elephant and black rhinoceros, primary ecological efforts were made to preserve mammalian species. However, by overlooking the other contributors to this environmental chain, certain plant species have been subjected to overgrazing and trampling, mostly by the elephants of the park. This overgrazing and trampling not only destroys much of the plant life, but also forces it to adapt its physiology to stimuli that are not inherent to its evolutionary progress. Some biologists argue that it is not herbivorization alone that is threatening the flora, but a number of other ecological factors including zoochory and nutrient cycling. Up to 77 species of South African endemic plant species have been listed as "vulnerable to elephant browsing."

Marine protected areas 
The Addo Elephant National Park Marine Protected Area and Bird Island Marine Protected Area are associated with the park.

Tourism 
In 2018 the highest visitor count in the park's 87-year history was recorded. The park received 305,510 visitors between 1 April 2017 and 31 March 2018 (up from 265,585 in the previous year). International visitors make up 55% of this number, with German, Dutch and British nationals in the majority.

There is a main camp, featuring a swimming pool, restaurant, flood lit water hole and various accommodation, four other rest camps and four camps run by concessionaires. The main entrance as well as two looped tourist roads in the park are tarred while the others are graveled. There is also an additional access road through the southern block of the park feeding off the N2 highway near Colchester; it joins up with the existing tourist roads in the park.

Gallery

See also 

 Addo Elephant Trail Run

References

External links 

Official website
 Park Management Plan

National parks of South Africa
Protected areas of the Eastern Cape
Protected areas established in 1931
Albany thickets
Sundays River